Camaegeria xanthopimplaeformis is a moth of the family Sesiidae. It is known from eastern Madagascar.

The forewings are hyaline with steel-blue reflects and the costal and marginal region blackish and bronze. It can be distinguished by its yellow body.

The holotype was collected by A.Seyrig North of Anivorano at the railroad Antananarivo-Toamasina.

References

Sesiidae
Moths described in 1955
Moths of Madagascar
Moths of Africa